Scott McHarg (born 16 June 1974) is a Scottish former professional footballer.

Career
In the summer of 1998, McHarg was part of the Junior revolution which swept through Clyde, being one of eleven players coming from the junior ranks to join the Bully Wee. He stayed for 8 months at Clyde, before joining Partick Thistle in February 1999. He went on to play for Dumbarton, before returning to the juniors to sign for Shotts Bon Accord. Scott then signed for Petershill Juniors and thereafter coached the team following his retirement due to knee problems.

McHarg coaches young people throughout Glasgow in his role with coaching and groupwork company A&M Training.

References

External links

1974 births
Footballers from Glasgow
Living people
Scottish footballers
Scottish Football League players
Scottish Junior Football Association players
Clyde F.C. players
Dumbarton F.C. players
Partick Thistle F.C. players
Shotts Bon Accord F.C. players
Blantyre Victoria F.C. players
Johnstone Burgh F.C. players
Hurlford United F.C. players
Petershill F.C. players
Association football wingers
Maryhill F.C. players